The 1996–97 Liga Gimel season saw 155 clubs competing in 11 regional divisions for promotion to Liga Bet.

Beitar Tiberias, Hapoel Kabul, Ironi I'billin, Maccabi Beit She'an, Hapoel Daliyat al-Karmel, Hapoel Asi Gilboa, Beitar Nes Tubruk, Hapoel Jaljulia, Maccabi HaShikma Ramat Hen, Maccabi Jerusalem/Ma'ale Adumim and Maccabi Be'er Sheva won their regional divisions and promoted to Liga Bet.

Upper Galilee Division

Western Galilee Division

Bay Division

Jezreel Division

Haifa Division

Samaria Division

Sharon Division

Dan Division

Tel Aviv Division

Central Division

Beitar Gedera were suspended from the league.

South Division

References
Liga Gimel Upper Galilee IFA 
Liga Gimel Western Galilee IFA 
Liga Gimel Bay IFA 
Liga Gimel Jezreel IFA 
Liga Gimel Haifa IFA 
Liga Gimel Samaria IFA 
Liga Gimel Sharon IFA 
Liga Gimel Dan IFA 
Liga Gimel Tel Aviv IFA 
Liga Gimel Central IFA 
Liga Gimel South IFA 

5
Liga Gimel seasons